Mary Hutchison (née Casey) (18 January 1915 – 1 October 1994) was the National President of the Scottish Co-operative Women’s Guild.

Life 
Hutchison grew up in the south part of Edinburgh and was one of three daughter to Catherine Sinclair and Michael Casey. Once leaving school she worked in upholstery. She married Lawrence Hutchison, who was a foreman joiner, in 1938 and she gave birth to three daughters.

In the early 1960s, she joined the Craigmillar Branch of Scottish Co-operative Women’s Guild (SCWG) and Hutchison discovered that the Guild offered great opportunities for working women which were not available anywhere else at the time. She attended business classes run by the SCWG. She started a youth club with vital support from the St. Cuthbert’s Co-operative Association Education Committee.

References 

1915 births
1994 deaths
Scottish women